Crompe is a surname. Notable people with the surname include:

Geoffrey Crompe, List of Lord Mayors of Dublin
William Crompe, MP for Canterbury
Ricardus Crompe, MP for Lewes (UK Parliament constituency)